Camelford was an electoral division of Cornwall in the United Kingdom which returned one member to sit on Cornwall Council between 2009 and 2021. It was abolished at the 2021 local elections, being succeeded by Camelford and Boscastle.

Councillors

Extent
Camelford represented the town of Camelford, the villages of Davidstow, St Clether and Tremaine, and the hamlets of Trewalder, Lanteglos, Castlegoff, Tramagenna, Helstone, Trewen, Valley Truckle, Trevia, Tregoodwell, Trewassa, Hallworthy, Tremail, Treglasta, Cold Northcott, Treneglos, Splatt, Three Hammers and Tresmeer. The hamlet of Newhall Green was shared with the St Teath and St Breward division and the settlement of Slaughterbridge was shared with the Tintagel division. The division was affected by boundary changes at the 2013 election. From 2009 to 2013, the division covered 7,079 hectares in total; after the boundary changes in 2013, it covered 7,508 hectares.

Election results

2017 election

2013 election

2009 election

References

Camelford
Electoral divisions of Cornwall Council